Louis Ray Beam, Jr. (born 1946) is an American white supremacist, conspiracy theorist and neo-fascist. After high school, he joined the United States Army and served as a helicopter door-gunner in Vietnam. He was awarded the Distinguished Flying Cross. Once he returned to the United States, he became a Klansman, leading a maritime Louisiana KKK element and Klan rally in Texas against government help to Vietnamese immigrant fishermen. He was also the leader of the Texas Emergency Reserve, a militia that was disbanded by the courts in 1982 as a result of a lawsuit filed under Texas anti-militia law by the Southern Poverty Law Center. The lawsuit was brought by SPLC after the militia harassed Vietnamese fishermen during the 1981 fishing season. Beam was using Camp Puller near Houston to train militia in 1980, including children as young as eight years old, in armed guerrilla tactics; the camp was shut down after publicity led to protests, and parents complaining that they were not aware of the children's activities at the camp. The Boy Scouts Council of Houston rejected a charter request from the troop at Camp Puller. Videotape shown during the shrimper hearing had Beam saying, "We're going to assume authority in this country."  He was later acquitted in a separate case of conspiring to overthrow the government. He moved to Idaho afterwards. He became active with Aryan Nations in the early 1980s. He is considered to be the first important proponent of the strategy of leaderless resistance within the white supremacist movement.

See also
VIETNAMESE FISHERMEN'S ASSOCIATION V. KNIGHTS OF THE KU KLUX KLAN

References

External links
 Louisbeam.com - Essays by Louis Beam
 Entry with the ADL/LEARN
 Essays by a klansman : being a compendium of Ku Klux Klan ideology, organizational methods, history, tactics, and opinions, with interpolations by the author

1946 births
Living people
People from Lufkin, Texas
American Ku Klux Klan members
American neo-fascists
Accelerationism
United States Army personnel of the Vietnam War
Recipients of the Distinguished Flying Cross (United States)
American Protestants
American conspiracy theorists
Aryan Nations
Patriot movement
United States Army soldiers
Date of birth missing (living people)
Sovereign citizen movement individuals